Stratovarius is the eleventh studio album by power metal band Stratovarius, released on 5 September 2005 through Sanctuary Records. The album reached No. 4 on the Finnish albums chart as well as the top 100 in six other countries. "Maniac Dance" was released as a single, reaching No. 4 on the Finnish singles chart and the top 100 in three other countries.

It is the last album to feature the band's longest-standing line-up which had been consistent since Episode (1996), as bassist Jari Kainulainen would leave Stratovarius later in the year, followed by guitarist and bandleader Timo Tolkki in 2008.

Overview
The release of Stratovarius came after a highly troubled period for the band in 2004, during which they temporarily split up following a nervous breakdown suffered by Tolkki. After a year-long hiatus, they reunited in 2005 and toured worldwide in support of the album, playing for the first time in the United States and Canada.

Stylistically the album displays a dramatically noticeable shift from the symphonic power metal sound of previous albums: the songs are more hard-edged and slower, with Tolkki's signature neo-classical shred soloing almost completely absent. Keyboardist Jens Johansson's role is particularly restricted, as well as Jörg Michael's drumming, which features hardly any of his signature double bass playing. Singer Timo Kotipelto also attempts a different vocal approach, mostly avoiding his usual high vocal range. Tolkki has since stated in interviews that he was unsatisfied with the end result of the album due to it being too far removed from the band's true style.

Track listing

Personnel
Stratovarius
Timo Kotipelto – lead vocals
Timo Tolkki – guitar, engineering, mixing, producer
Jens Johansson – keyboard arrangement, orchestral arrangement (track 7)
Jörg Michael – drums
Jari Kainulainen – bass

Additional credits
Max Lilja – cello (track 4)
Petri Bäckström – tenor vocals (track 4)
Marko Vaara – backing vocals
Kimmo Blom – backing vocals
Pasi Rantanen – backing vocals
Anssi Stenberg – backing vocals
"Starbuck" – spoken vocals (track 4)
Mikko Oinonen – engineering (drums)
Svante Forsbäck – mastering

Chart performance

Album

Singles

References

External links
Stratovarius at stratovarius.com

Stratovarius albums
2005 albums
Sanctuary Records albums